David Krummenacker (born May 24, 1975) is a professional track athlete.

Background 

Krummenacker was born in El Paso, Texas. He graduated from Las Cruces High School in New Mexico in 1993 where he won several state track titles and also played on the basketball team.
He attended Georgia Tech where he trained under coach Alan Drosky and won back-to-back NCAA Indoor 800 m titles (1997–1998).  He graduated in 1998 with a degree in management.

He currently resides in Tucson, Arizona where he trains under the direction of coach Luiz de Oliviera and competes for Team Adidas.  His agent is Rich Kenah.

Athletic career 

Krummenacker was the 2003 World and U.S. Indoor 800 m champion.  He won back-to-back-to-back U.S. Outdoor 800 m champion from 2001 to 2003.  He was the first person to win the title 3 straight years since Johnny Gray accomplished the feat from 1985 to 1987.  The only person ever to win the 800 m title more than 3 years in a row was James Robinson who won it every year from 1978 to 1982.
His personal records (PRs) include 1:43.92 (2002) for 800 m and 3:31.91 (2002) for 1500 m.

References

External links
 
 

1975 births
Living people
American male middle-distance runners
Georgia Tech Yellow Jackets men's track and field athletes
World Athletics Indoor Championships winners